Fitling is a hamlet in the East Riding of Yorkshire, England, in an area known as Holderness.

It forms part of the civil parish of East Garton.

In 1823 parish inhabitants numbered 119. Occupations included ten farmers and a shoemaker.

References

External links

Villages in the East Riding of Yorkshire
Holderness